The Appleby Horse Fair, also known as Appleby New Fair, is "an annual gathering of Gypsies and Travellers in the town of Appleby-in-Westmorland in Cumbria, England." The horse fair is held each year in early June, attracting roughly 10,000 Gypsies and Travellers, about 1,000 caravans, several hundred horse-drawn vehicles, and about 30,000 visitors. The Gypsy and Traveller attendees include British Romanichal, Irish Travellers, Scottish Gypsy and Traveller groups, Kale (Welsh Romanies) and more.

History and location
The Fair is billed as the biggest traditional Gypsy Fair in Europe, and is commonly likened to a large family gathering. The horses are washed in the River Eden and trotted up and down the 'flashing lane' most main days. There is a market on Jimmy Winter's Field selling a variety of goods, some traditional to the Gypsy travelling community, and a range other horse-related products.

The fair is held outside the town of Appleby, where the Roman Road crosses Long Marton Road, not far from Gallows Hill, named after the public hangings that were once carried out there. In the mid-20th century, the story developed that the fair originated with a royal charter to the borough of Appleby from King James II of England in 1685. However, recent research has shown that the 1685 charter, which was cancelled before it was enrolled, is of no relevance.

Appleby's medieval borough fair, held at Whitsuntide, ceased in 1885. The 'New Fair', held in early June on Gallows Hill, which was then unenclosed land outside the borough boundary, began in 1775 for sheep and cattle drovers and horse dealers to sell their stock; by the 1900s it had evolved into a major Gypsy/Traveller occasion. Throughout the Fair's history, no group claimed ownership of the Fair or was charged to attend it, staying to one of the Fair's principles of being a people's fair.

The legal status of the Fair does not depend on a charter, therefore, but on the legal concept of 'prescriptive right': easement by prescription or custom.

Cancellations
The fair has been cancelled twice; in 2001, due to foot-and-mouth, and in 2020, due to the COVID-19 pandemic; the 2020 fair was held nonetheless with six participants, in response to a Traveller belief that the fair would be lost if it did not occur. As many as a hundred spectators also defied the ban. In 2021, Covid-19 restrictions on mass gatherings prevented the fair taking place on the traditional dates (3–7 June), and on 21 June 2021, the Multi Agency Strategic Co-ordinating Group published a statement to the effect that alternative dates of 12–15 August 2021 had been identified for the 2021 Appleby Fair, subject to favourable Covid-19 data and the national relaxation of restrictions on large gatherings, which were planned to be announced on 21 June 2021. According to police estimates, 300-400 people visited Appleby over the weekend of 4–6 June, mostly day trippers, being a mixture of Gypsies and tourists. Behaviour was described as "very positive in the main". There were "around 10 caravans in the area" and not over 1,000, as would be usual.

In 2021, Shera Rom Billy Welch warned Home Secretary Priti Patel that the event was threatened by the proposed Police, Crime, Sentencing and Courts Bill, stating that if the bill was enforced, police could confiscate the homes of Gypsies and Travellers if, upon complaint of local residents, they did not immediately move on. Welch highlighted the substantial shortage of approved permanent pitches and transit pitches at Traveller sites, leaving many Travellers with nowhere legal to stop.

Organisation
The Fair is a regular but spontaneous gathering, and is not organised by any individual or group, although the Gypsies and Travellers have a Shera Rom (Head Romani), who occupies Fair Hill under Licence from the Town Council, and arranges toilets, rubbish skips, water supplies, horse grazing etc. for Fair Hill. He acts as liaison with the local authority co-ordinating committee (Multi-Agency Strategic Co-ordinating Group, or MASCG), which manages the public authorities' response to the Fair. The "Shera Rom" is the head of his extended family only, but is recognised as a spokesman for the wider Romani community. Other landowners operate campsites and car parks, and they arrange their own toilets, water and clean-up.

The main activities take place on Fair Hill (the main campsite field, with some catering and trade) and more recently on the Market Field, which was opened up by a local farmer about 10 years ago, and is now the main stall trading and catering area. There are half a dozen licensed campsites and car parks nearby. Most horse trading takes place at the crossroads (known to the local authority as 'Salt Tip Corner') and on Long Marton Road (known to the Gypsies and Travellers as the 'flashing lane'), where horses are shown off (or 'flashed') by trotting up and down at speed.

Many of the horses are taken down to 'the Sands', near the Appleby town centre beside the River Eden, where horses are ridden into the river to be washed, and it is not unusual to see scores of horses tied up opposite The Grapes public house. The highway at that location is closed to vehicle traffic for the main days of the Fair, which are now the Friday, Saturday and Sunday.

The Fair customarily ends on the second Wednesday in June, and starts on the Thursday before that. Although the last Tuesday was once the main horse dealing day, due to the growth of the market field and the large number of visitors, the main day is now the Saturday, with the Fair's activities over by the Monday morning.

Besides the horses, there are fortune tellers, palm readers, buskers and music stalls, clothing stalls, tools and hardware, china, stainless steel, and horse-related merchandise including harness and carriages.

Controversy
The horse fair has generated some controversy over the years, with some complaints of mess being left in the town, violent crime and animal cruelty.

The Local Authority (Eden District Council, which convenes the Multi-Agency Strategic Co-Ordinating Group to manage the official response to the fair) is required to deal with these matters, and their official sources provide a context for these controversial issues.

Arrests
In 2014, there were 28 arrests at the Fair, the lowest for several years; arrests were made for, among other things, drug use, drunkenness, and obstruction, which senior police confirmed was not disproportionate to other large-scale public gatherings. In 2015, this number came down further, with only 15 arrests over the whole Fair, for what the police described as "mostly low level disorder". During the 2018 Fair there were 7 arrests, including one arrest for a previously issued warrant. The number of caravans in the Eden District in 2018 was significantly higher, approximately 20% up on 2017. At the rescheduled 2021 fair, police noted that, with 13 arrests, it was the "worst level of fair-related offending in Appleby since 2014."

Litter

Cost
The cost of hosting the Fair was £496,000 in 2021 due to a change in the method used to calculate the policing costs. There is controversy regarding the costs met by the Cumbrian taxpayer, whilst the fair brings in significant income for local businesses and land owners.
Some land owners charge up to £400 per stall [citation?].

Cancellation and postponement of the Fair in 2020, 2021 and 2022
The slow response to cancel the Fair in 2020 caused upset in the town; the impression from some was that the council put financial gain of a few over the health of Travellers and locals, particularly the vulnerable and elderly, waiting for government legislation to be enforced rather than acting on guidance before the event was cancelled. The event did go ahead with very small numbers. In 2021 the date of the fair was moved to 12 – 15 August due to Covid-19 Restrictions  
 
In 2022, the fair began on 9 June 2022, to avoid a clash with the Jubilee celebrations. 
In 2023, the fair dates will be 08 June 2023 to 14 June 2023

Animal cruelty
The RSPCA patrols the fair scrupulously and, although in 2009 Animal Aid called for the fair to be banned, the instances of cruelty are few, and are prosecuted where they do occur. Warnings and advice are given in borderline cases, and the very great majority of horses at the fair are well looked after, well treated, and in good condition. In 2016, the RSPCA stated unequivocally that although there were some welfare issues, mostly brought about by the hot weather, there is only a small minority of people who attend the Fair that have little regard for animal welfare.

See also

Notes

References

External links

 The official website for the fair, which carries public service announcements about dates, parking, licensing, trading, camping and accommodation etc. is at http://www.applebyfair.org.
 University of Liverpool Special Collections and Archives "Appleby and other Horse Fairs"
 Photos of Appleby Horse fair at www.geograph.co.uk
 
 Andy Connell: Appleby Horse Fair: Origins, Mythology, Evolution, and Evaluation 

Annual fairs
Tourist attractions in Cumbria
Fairs in England
Annual events in the United Kingdom
Romani in England
Culture in Cumbria
Horses in the United Kingdom
Appleby-in-Westmorland
Equestrian festivals
Recurring events established in 1775
Horse trade
Long Marton